Duilio Beretta and Oliver Golding were the defending champions but did not enter this year.

Robin Kern and Julian Lenz won the title, defeating Maxim Dubarenco and Vladyslav Manafov 7–5, 6–4 in the final.

Seeds

Draw

Finals

Top half

Bottom half

External links
Main Draw

2011 US Open (tennis)
US Open, 2011 Boys' Doubles